Yelena Bet (sometimes listed as Alana Bets, born May 2, 1976) is a Belarusian sprint canoer who competed in the early to mid-2000s. Competing in two Summer Olympics, she earned her best finish of sixth in the K-4 500 m event at Sydney in 2000.

References
Sports-Reference.com profile

1976 births
Belarusian female canoeists
Canoeists at the 2000 Summer Olympics
Canoeists at the 2004 Summer Olympics
Living people
Olympic canoeists of Belarus